The 2018 Croatian Cup Final between Dinamo Zagreb and Hajduk Split was played on 23 May 2018 at Stadion HNK Cibalia in Vinkovci. This was the first meeting of the two most popular Croatian clubs in the final since 2009. Dinamo Zagreb secured a domestic double after winning both the cup and the 2017–18 Croatian First Football League.

Road to the final

Match details

External links
Official website 

2018 Final
GNK Dinamo Zagreb matches
HNK Hajduk Split matches
Cup Final